Zlot can refer to
 Polish złoty, current Polish currency
Zlot (currency), medieval currency in Eastern Europe
Zlot (Bor), a town in eastern Serbia